Toyosi is a Yoruba given name meaning "Worth rejoicing in the lord". Notable people with the name include:

 Toyosi Akerele-Ogunsiji, Nigerian social entrepreneur
 Oluwatoyosi Ogunseye, Nigerian journalist
 Gbenga Toyosi Olawepo, Nigerian human rights activist and businessman
 Toyosi Olusanya, English footballer
 Toyosi Shittabey, Irish murder victim

References